The 2007 UCI Cyclo-cross World Championships were held from 27  to 28 January 2007 at the Domenico Savio Park in Hooglede-Gits, Belgium.

Medal summary

Medal table

External links
 Official website
 Men race report
 Under-23 race report
 Junior race report
 Women race report

 
UCI Cyclo-cross World Championships
World Championships
UCI Cyclo-cross World Championships
International cycle races hosted by Belgium
Sport in West Flanders
Hooglede
January 2007 sports events in Europe